Rearrangement may refer to:

Chemistry 
 Rearrangement reaction

Mathematics 
 Rearrangement inequality
 The Riemann rearrangement theorem, also called the Riemann series theorem
 see also Lévy–Steinitz theorem
 A permutation  of the terms of a conditionally convergent series

Genetics 
 Chromosomal rearrangements, such as:
 Translocations
 Ring chromosomes
 Chromosomal inversions